The 2021 Liberty Flames football team represented Liberty University in the 2021 NCAA Division I FBS football season. They were led by third-year head coach Hugh Freeze and played their home games at Williams Stadium in Lynchburg, Virginia. The Flames competed as an FBS independent. They finished the regular season 7–5.

The Flames received an invite to the LendingTree Bowl where they played Eastern Michigan, winning 56–20.

Previous season 
In a season limited due to the ongoing COVID-19 pandemic, the Flames finished the 2020 season 10–1; the team's only loss was a one point loss at NC State. They received a bid to the Cure Bowl where they defeated no. 12 Coastal Carolina in overtime. They finished the season ranked no. 17 in the AP Poll and no. 18 in the Coaches Poll. The 2020 team was the first to win ten games since 2008 and the first since the program joined the FBS in 2018.

Schedule

Source

Roster

Game summaries

Campbell

at Troy

Old Dominion

at Syracuse

at UAB

Middle Tennessee

at Louisiana–Monroe

at North Texas

UMass

at No. 16 Ole Miss

Louisiana

Army

vs. Eastern Michigan (LendingTree Bowl)

References

Liberty
Liberty Flames football seasons
LendingTree Bowl champion seasons
Liberty Flames football